Shigeo (written: 茂雄, 茂生, 茂男, 茂夫, 成雄, 成男, 重雄, 重男, 重夫, 繁雄, 繁男, 晟郎, 殖生 or 滋雄) is a masculine Japanese given name. Notable people with the name include:

, Japanese photographer
, Japanese swimmer
, Japanese sculptor and graphic designer
, Japanese swimmer
, Japanese photographer
, Japanese photographer
, Japanese inventor and academic
, Japanese table tennis player
, Japanese musicologist
, Japanese politician
, Japanese actor
, Japanese botanist
, Japanese businessman
, Japanese engineer
, Japanese sumo wrestler
, Japanese baseball player and manager
, Japanese swimmer
, Japanese boxer
, Japanese sport wrestler
, Japanese footballer
, Japanese professional wrestler
, Japanese politician
, Japanese footballer
, Japanese mathematician
, Japanese physicist
, Japanese footballer and manager
, Japanese engineer
, Japanese footballer
, Japanese swimmer
, Japanese mayor
, Japanese judge
, Japanese AV actor
, Japanese footballer and manager
, Japanese baseball player

Japanese masculine given names